Alba Mellado (born 18 March 1992) is a Spanish football striker, currently playing for Santa Teresa.

Football career

With Rayo Vallecano, Mellado took part in the 2011–12 Champions League. During her time at Madrid CFF, she was captain on a number of occasions. In addition to playing for Madrid CFF, she also held a coaching role in the children's teams. In August 2020, Mellado agreed to extend her contract at Madrid for a further season, however, she announced her sudden departure from the club in January 2021 having spent seven seasons at the club. That same month, her transfer to Santa Teresa was announced.

Beach soccer career
In beach soccer, Mellado has been called up to the Spain national team to play in the Euro Beach Soccer League. She also represented Madrid CFF in the 2021 Women's Euro Winners Cup. Madrid won the tournament with Mellado scoring four goals in the final and finishing as the tournament's top goalscorer with 14 goals.

References

1992 births
Living people
Spanish women's footballers
Primera División (women) players
Madrid CFF players
Rayo Vallecano Femenino players
Women's association football forwards
Santa Teresa CD players
Footballers from Madrid
Spanish beach soccer players
CF Pozuelo de Alarcón Femenino players